The Evangelical Lutheran Church in Bavaria is a Lutheran member church of the Evangelical Church in Germany in the German state of Bavaria.

The seat of the church is in Munich. The Landesbischof (bishop) of the church is Heinrich Bedford-Strohm. There are six regional bishops (Regionalbischöfe). The Evangelical Lutheran Church in Bavaria is one of 20 Lutheran, United Protestant and Reformed churches of the EKD. The church has 2,252,159 members (2020) in 1,540 parishes. The Evangelical Lutheran Church in Bavaria is a member church of the United Evangelical Lutheran Church of Germany, the Community of Protestant Churches in Europe and of the Lutheran World Federation. The Church runs a conference venue at Tutzing called Evangelische Akademie Tutzing. The most prominent churches of the Evangelical Lutheran Church in Bavaria are St. Matthäus Church in Munich and St. Lorenz Church in Nuremberg where new state bishops get inaugurated. Munich is predominantly Catholic, whereas Nuremberg is a Lutheran stronghold.

Some theological statements 
The theological teaching goes back on Martin Luther. The ordination of women is allowed. The blessing of same-sex marriages has been allowed by the synod and depends on the local church administration.

History 
During the Protestant Reformation, Bavaria (consisting at that point only of what is today called Altbayern) remained predominantly Roman Catholic. In the early 19th century, the largely Protestant Palatinate and Franconia were annexed to the Kingdom of Bavaria, and all Protestant churches in the kingdom were administratively subordinated in 1817 to an upper consistory in Munich and an umbrella, the Protestant Church in the Kingdom of Bavaria, was founded in 1821. At first, this church consisted of Lutheran and Calvinist congregations in today's Bavaria and congregations of united Protestant confession (as of 1817) in the then Bavarian Governorate of the Palatinate on the left bank of the river Rhine. Since 1848 the Palatine congregations formed a separate church body (United Protestant Evangelical Christian Church of the Palatinate (Palatine State Church)).

Thus the church body renamed into Protestant State Church in the Kingdom of Bavaria right of the Rhine. In 1918 the Calvinist congregations seceded and formed their own church, the Evangelical Reformed Church in Bavaria (which merged with the Evangelical Reformed Church in Northwest Germany in 1989 to form the Evangelical Reformed Church – Synod of Reformed Churches in Bavaria and Northwestern Germany).

So in 1921 the Protestant state church renamed into Evangelical Lutheran Church in Bavaria right of the Rhine when the new church constitution accounted for the Kingdom having become a republic and the Reformed congregations having formed their separate church body. On 1 April 1921 the Evangelical Lutheran State Church of Saxe-Coburg merged in the Bavarian church body. The number of parishioners amounted to 1,575,000 in 1925.

During the struggle of the churches under the Nazi dictatorship the Bavarian Lutheran church body remained an intact church, since the Nazi-submissive German Christians fraction remained a minority in the synod after the unconstitutional election imposed by Hitler on 23 July 1933. Nazi opponents, forming the Confessing Church, could act within the official bodies of the church. The prior name extension right of the Rhine was removed in 1948, after Bavaria left of the Rhine, i.e. the Palatinate, had been separated from Bavaria by the Allies in 1945.

Presidents and bishops

Presidents
 1883–1897: 
 1897–1909: 
 1909–1917: 
 1917–1933:

Landesbischöfe
 1933–1955: Hans Meiser
 1955–1975: 
 1975–1994: 
 1994–1999: 
 1999–2011: Johannes Friedrich
 2011–present: Heinrich Bedford-Strohm

Synod 
The election of the synod is for six years.

Church office
The administrative headquarters are called Munich Church Office (Landeskirchenamt) which is based in Munich.

Notes

External links 
 Evangelical Lutheran Church in Bavaria
 Evangelical Church in Germany

Christianity in Bavaria
Bavaria
Bavaria
Bavaria
Bavaria
Bavaria
Bavaria Lutheran